Fair Park is a recreational and educational complex in Dallas, Texas, United States, located immediately east of downtown. The  area is registered as a Dallas Landmark and National Historic Landmark; many of the buildings were constructed for the Texas Centennial Exposition in 1936.

Fair Park has been designated a Great Place in America by the American Planning Association.

History
The site was established as an  fairground on the outskirts of East Dallas for the Dallas State Fair in 1886. After a fire and financial loss by the fair association in 1904, voters approved the "Reardon Plan." It became Dallas' second public park, known as "Fair Park."

An important figure in Fair Park's development was landscape architect and city planner George Kessler. In 1906, he was responsible for the first formal plan for the park influenced by the City Beautiful Movement. The City Beautiful Movement advocated well planned public spaces, tree-lined boulevards, monuments, public art, and fountains which would ‘beautify’ the city.

A milestone in Fair Park's history was 1936, when the Texas Centennial Exposition was held there. In preparation for the six-month event, the appearance of the park was dramatically altered by architect George Dahl and consulting architect Paul Cret. The park was transformed from an early 20th-century fairground into an Art Deco showcase. While many of the exposition's buildings were meant to be temporary, several have survived and have been restored to some extent. Over the years, the park was expanded to its current .

Fair Park was declared a National Historic Landmark in 1986 as one of the nation's largest surviving assemblages of buildings related to an exposition. Administration of the park was transferred to the Dallas Parks Department in 1988. Today, the cultural facilities and annual events attract an unsubstantiated estimate of 5 million visitors annually, the bulk of which attend during the 24-day State Fair of Texas.

Restoration and future
Many of the existing Art Deco buildings have been restored visually to their 1936 appearance and upgraded to modern building standards. In anticipation of DART's light rail service the historic Parry Avenue entrance gates were restored in 2009. The four cameo reliefs on Centennial Building underwent a professional conservation treatment in 2000 and the Esplanade fountain pylons and six monumental sculptures in 2004. Several sculptures were reconstructed and feature a dramatic light and water show.

In 2003, the Fair Park Comprehensive Development plan was produced by Hargreaves Associates. This comprehensive plan included recommendations for the physical site, park programs, activities, funding options, and management alternatives. The park received a $72 million city bond allocation in 2006 for repairs and improvements.

In September 2014, a blue ribbon task force appointed by Mayor Mike Rawlings submitted a report on the rejuvenation of Fair Park. The Mayor's Task Force plan envisions a public-private partnership led by a non profit organization to be charged with over arching powers to control the revitalization of Fair Park, including the State Fair of Texas. Architect/City planner Antonio Di Mambro, with international experience in infrastructure planning and neighborhood revitalization, encouraged the Mayor to use the Task Force report as a building block for constructive dialogue with residents, stakeholders and the neighborhoods around Fair Park. Following the presentation of the Task Force Plan, Mayor Mike Rawlings said, "I felt passion by all the council and park board members that they want Fair Park to be all it can be and they're interested in taking this big challenge on".

In March 2015, the State Fair pushed back on any notion of tightening up the footprint of its current operation.  Dallas Morning News reporter Robert Wilonsky called the State Fair's response "rather dramatic"  The article also quoted Stephen Page of the closed Texas Museum of Automotive History from 2012 as saying, "The City's requirement that tenants vacate the majority of the buildings in Fair Park during the State Fair is the principal reason for Fair Park's ongoing decline."   Wilonsky also quoted a ‘prominent member of the Mayor's Task Force’ as suggesting privately "that the State Fair's presence at Fair Park also needs to be greatly reduced."

On November 18, 2015, Dallas City Council considered Mayor Mike Rawlings' proposal to turn over management of Fair Park to a non-profit corporation headed up by the "Father of DART" Walt Humann. Under the Mayor's plan, the city would still own the 277-acre site, but a non-profit foundation would manage the grounds and assets. In 2016 Mayor Mike Rawlings' proposal to turn the park over to a non-profit corporation headed by Humann was defeated by the Dallas City Attorney and a lack of support by Dallas City Council.

Cultural district
Many Dallas cultural institutions call Fair Park home.

Hall of State

The Hall of State is managed by the Dallas Historical Society, which hosts exhibits inside about Dallas history and culture.

Old Mill Inn
The Old Mill Inn was one of the few Texas Centennial Exposition buildings not to incorporate Art Deco styling. Clad in fieldstone with heavy-timber construction, this was the exhibit building for the flour milling industry. It now sporadically serves Fair Park as a restaurant.

Magnolia Lounge and (former) Hall of Religion
This little-known project by New York architect William Lescaze introduced European Modernism to Texas in 1936. The design of this hospitality lounge for the Magnolia Petroleum Company included elements commonly found in Art Deco architecture. However, the building's overall image was radically different from that of any other structure at the Texas Centennial Exposition.

Site of Theatre '47, the first professional, regional theater company in the United States, the small performing space, the Margo Jones Theatre pays tribute to the visionary founder of America's regional theater movement Margo Jones. Immediately adjacent to the Magnolia Lounge is the former Hall of Religion.

African American Museum

The current museum building occupies virtually the same site as the Texas Centennial Exposition's Hall of Negro Life. It boasts a permanent collection that consists of the works of such highly regarded African American artists as Romare Bearden, Jacob Lawrence, Larry D. Alexander, John T. Biggers, Clementine Hunter, Benny Andrews, Edward Mitchell Bannister and Arthello Beck

The Leonhardt Lagoon
South of the Midway, George Dahl arranged Dallas's future cultural institutions informally around a tranquil lagoon, offering Texas Centennial exposition visitors a peaceful, naturalistic counterpoint to the activity of the exposition.

In 1981, Patricia Johanson was commissioned to redesign and restore the badly degraded lagoon. Since reopening in 1986, the redesigned lagoon has become recognized as a major earth sculpture and one of the earliest examples of art as bioremediation.

Museum of Nature and Science

The Museum of Nature & Science occupied two buildings around the lagoon (one named "The Science Place"), and a planetarium next to the WRR building, before moving most of its operations to the new Perot campus at Victory Park in December 2012. The former History Building remains open on weekends as a secondary campus of the Perot Museum. The IMAX theatre and planetarium at the Fair Park campus are shuttered.

The History Building, once the Museum of Natural History, was designed for the Texas Centennial Exposition as a monolithic, rectangular box. The entrance features three vertical window bays with decorative aluminum mullions. Flanking it are paired pilasters with shell-motif capitals. The rest of the building is clad in limestone. In 1988, the northeast corner of the building was excavated, creating a series of landscaped terraces.

Fair Park Band Shell
The concentric plaster arches of the Band Shell comprise an essentially Art Deco composition. Elements of the Streamline Moderne style are present in the reinforced concrete backstage building. Lighting pylons surround the sloping 5,000-seat amphitheater.

Texas Discovery Gardens
This was the original Horticulture Building for the Texas Centennial Exposition. It has since been altered by exterior renovations and additions, including the minimalist glass Blachly Conservatory. In the gardens behind the main structure is a model home that the Portland Cement Company originally built for the Exposition.

Cotton Bowl

The Cotton Bowl stadium was built in below-grade in 1930, and was originally known as "Fair Park Stadium." Subsequent expansions resulted in a present capacity of 92,200. The Cotton Bowl Classic college football bowl game was played there from 1937–2009. Annually during the State Fair of Texas, it hosts the OU–TX game between the University of Oklahoma and the University of Texas, along with the Southwest Airlines State Fair Classic game between Grambling State University (Louisiana) and Prairie View A&M University. It was also the first home of the Dallas Cowboys, from 1960 until their move to Texas Stadium in Irving in 1971.

Music Hall at Fair Park

Music Hall, built in Spanish colonial revival style, was the General Motors Building during the Centennial Exposition. It underwent extensive remodeling in 1972. It was home of the Dallas Opera until 2009 and is the current home for Dallas Summer Musicals.

Women's Building

The Women's building was originally built in 1910 as a park coliseum. It was remodeled as an Art Deco structure for the Centennial Exposition during which it was known as the Hall of Administration. The building was operated as The Women's Museum from 2000 to 2011, but now is only used for special events and exhibits.

Midway and other structures

The Texas Star, opened in 1985, is the fourth-largest Ferris wheel in North America.
Among political infighting, lawsuits and community unrest, Starplex Amphitheatre (f/k/a Smirnoff Music Centre, Coca-Cola Starplex, and Gexa Energy Pavilion, and n/k/a Dos Equis Pavilion) was built. Former Park Board member Jim Graham said the City's agreement with PACE Entertainment "stinks".
The Top o' Texas Tower, opened in 2013, is a  observation tower ride. The tower's base may eventually house a museum devoted to the State Fair and Texas Centennial Exposition collection. At a cost of more than $12,000,000, the Tower was to be the featured ride of the failed Summer Adventures program. Summer Adventures, while planned as an annual event, was open for one year and shuttered, despite a $30,000,000 investment.
Fair Park is home to the Texas State Vietnam Memorial.

Annual events

The complex's signature event is the annual State Fair of Texas, which has been held there since 1886. It currently lasts 24 days and begins in the last Friday in September and runs to the third Sunday in October.

Summer Adventures in Fair Park (initially called Summer Place Park)

The State Fair had plans to unveil Summer Place Park in 2012. These plans would eventually turn into Summer Adventures in Fair Park, a beach-themed amusement park, that operated from May to August 2013. Despite a $30,000,000 investment in Summer Adventures, the event was shuttered after just one season.

Other events
The North Texas Irish Festival takes place the first weekend in March each year.
Earth Day Texas takes place annually in April.
Fair Park Fourth is the annual Independence Day celebration for the City of Dallas.

Other notable events

In 1961, the musical film State Fair was filmed in Fair Park.
In July 1984, Fair Park was transformed into a Formula One circuit for a weekend to host the Dallas Grand Prix and Can-Am race. The event was conceived as a way to demonstrate Dallas's status as a "world-class city", but the track failed.
In May 1988, Fair Park also hosted Trans-Am Series race with a different layout.
On March 8–11, 1990, the Nintendo World Championships were held within the Fair Park's Automobile Building.
In December 2013, the Chanel Paris–Dallas pre-fall show was held at Fair Park.
In January 2021, Fair Park became a mass COVID-19 vaccination hub operated by Dallas County Health and Human Services. FEMA also opened a hub at the park for vaccinations of 17 underserved zip codes.

Lap records
The fastest official race lap records at the Dallas Fair Park Circuit are listed as:

Transportation
Fair Park is easily accessible from I-30, the major east-west interstate through Dallas.
Fair Park is served by several bus routes by DART.
DART's Green Line connects Fair Park to southeast and downtown Dallas with Fair Park Station and MLK Jr. Station. During the State Fair of Texas DART runs "special event" trains from the Red Line and Blue Line to Fair Park Station.

Education
Irma Rangel Young Women's Leadership School is located in Fair Park.

See also

List of National Historic Landmarks in Texas
National Register of Historic Places listings in Dallas County, Texas
Recorded Texas Historic Landmarks in Dallas County
List of Dallas Landmarks

References

Other sources
Rob Walker (October, 1984). "1st Dallas Grand Prix: Cool Keke". Road & Track, 178-182.
Mike S. Lang (1992). Grand Prix!: Race-by-race account of Formula 1 World Championship motor racing. Volume 4: 1981 to 1984. Haynes Publishing Group.

External links

City of Dallas: Fair Park
Friends of Fair Park
Fair Park Calendar of Events
Dallasparks.org: Fair Park Comprehensive Development Plan

 
Parks in Dallas
Amusement parks in Texas
Fairgrounds in the United States
World's fair sites in Texas
Dallas Landmarks
National Register of Historic Places in Dallas
Dallas (Fair Park)
Dallas (Fair Park)
Dallas (Fair Park)
Tourist attractions in Dallas
Paul Philippe Cret buildings
World's fair architecture in Texas
Art Deco architecture in Texas
Buildings and structures on the National Register of Historic Places in Texas
Event venues on the National Register of Historic Places in Texas
National Historic Landmarks in Texas
1936 establishments in Texas